ERAN or Eran may refer to:

People

 Eran Zahavi (born 1987), Israeli footballer playing for Guangzhou R&F F.C.

Places

Eran, India, a city site in Sagar district in Madhya Pradesh state in India

Other
early right anterior negativity, a part of the electroencephalogram
EDGE Radio Access Network, a GERAN network without GSM
ERAN, a child helpline based in Tel Aviv, Israel

See also 
 
 Iran (disambiguation)